Marcos Pereira Lima (born February 14, 1990 in Imperatriz) is a Brazilian footballer.

Teams
  CFZ 2010
  Cerro Largo 2011

External links
 

1990 births
Living people
Brazilian footballers
Association football defenders
Brazilian expatriate footballers
Cerro Largo F.C. players
Expatriate footballers in Uruguay
People from Imperatriz
Sportspeople from Maranhão